Dioxaphetyl butyrate (INN; trade names Amidalgon, Spasmoxal) is an opioid analgesic which is a diphenylacetic acid derivative, related to other open-chain opioid drugs such as dextropropoxyphene, levacetylmethadol (LAAM), lefetamine and dimenoxadol.

It produces similar effects to other opioids, including dependence, euphoria, analgesia, sedation, constipation, dizziness and nausea.

In the United States it is a Schedule I Narcotic controlled substance with an ACSCN of 9621 and a 2013 annual aggregate manufacturing quota of zero.

References 

Butyrate esters
Synthetic opioids
4-Morpholinyl compunds
Ethyl esters
Mu-opioid receptor agonists